Synargis gela is a species of butterfly from the genus Synargis in the family Riodinidae. It was originally described in 1853.

References

Nymphidiini
Butterflies described in 1853